Park Sin-heung (born 9 November 1968) is a South Korean field hockey player. He competed in the men's tournament at the 1996 Summer Olympics.

References

External links

1968 births
Living people
South Korean male field hockey players
Olympic field hockey players of South Korea
Field hockey players at the 1996 Summer Olympics
Place of birth missing (living people)
Asian Games gold medalists for South Korea
Asian Games silver medalists for South Korea
Medalists at the 1994 Asian Games
Medalists at the 1998 Asian Games
Asian Games medalists in field hockey
Field hockey players at the 1994 Asian Games
Field hockey players at the 1998 Asian Games
1998 Men's Hockey World Cup players